KGHM Polska Miedź S.A. (Kombinat Górniczo-Hutniczy Miedzi), commonly known as KGHM, is a Polish multinational corporation that employs around 34,000 people around the world and has been a major copper and silver producer for more than 50 years. In 1991, the company was established as a state enterprise and since 1997, their shares have been traded on the Warsaw Stock Exchange. Currently, KGHM operates 9 open-pit and underground mines located in Poland, Canada, the USA and Chile and is actively advancing 4 projects. KGHM produces key global resources including copper, copper sulphate, gold, silver, nickel, nickel sulphate, molybdenum, rhenium, lead, sulphuric acid, selenium, platinum group metals. KGHM is based in Lower Silesian Voivodeship in Lubin, Poland.

History

Early history and foundation 
In 1951, the construction of the Copper Smelter in Legnica was commenced to smelt copper from the ore mined in the so-called old Lower Silesian copper basin ("Lena" and "Konrad" mines).

In 1957, Jan Wyżykowski discovered copper ore deposits near Lubin and Polkowice ("Sieroszowice" field).

On December 28, 1959 by the decision of the Ministry of Heavy Industry, Zakłady Górnicze "Lubin" was established as a state owned company and in 1961, transformed into Kombinat Górniczo-Hutniczy Miedzi (KGHM), which was supposed to deal with the extraction and processing of copper extracted from the newly discovered fields. At the same time, KGHM incorporated two copper mines in the area of the piedmont of the Sudetes from the old copper-bearing basin (closed in 1973 - "Lena" and in 1987 - "Konrad").

Expansion 
In the years 1962-1975, Tadeusz Zastawnik was the director of KGHM (in the years 1952-1957 he was a Member of Parliament, and in the mid-1950s the director of the Union of Mining and Metallurgy of Non-Ferrous Metals). In 1968, the construction of the "Lubin" and "Polkowice" mines and the modernization of the Legnica smelter ended. The construction of the Głogów smelter started, and at the end of the 1960s, geologists discovered new, even richer copper deposits in Rudna.

In January 1996, the "Polkowice-Sieroszowice" Division was established, which was established as the result of the merger "Polkowice" and "Sieroszowice" mines.

From the day the state enterprise was established, until August 9, 1976, the Minister of Heavy Industry, and then the Minister of Metallurgy (the office was transformed into the office of the Minister of Metallurgy and Machine Industry) supervised operations.

Transformation 
On September 9, 1991, the state-owned enterprise Kombinat Górniczo-Hutniczy Miedzi in Lubin was transformed into a sole-shareholder company of the State Treasury - KGHM Polska Miedź SA. On September 12, 1991, the company was entered in the commercial register kept by the District Court in Legnica and on the same day, the court removed the former entity from the register of state-owned enterprises.

Integration 
On December 6, 2011, the management boards of KGHM Polska Miedź SA and Quadra FNX Mining Ltd. signed an agreement on the takeover of the Canadian enterprise by KGHM. On February 20, 2012, the general meeting of shareholders of Quadra FNX Mining Ltd. accepted the transaction of a friendly takeover of 100% of shares in the company Quadra FNX by KGHM Polska Miedź SA, and on March 5, 2012, the above transaction was closed.

Since then, Quadra FNX has been operating under the new name of KGHM International Ltd. The transaction value amounted to approximately $2.8 billion. The purchase was financed with funds of KGHM After the acquisition, the size of the combined resource base is 37.4 million tons of copper (fourth largest deposit in the world). The combined annual copper production was then 526 thousand tonnes. One of the key assets of KGHM International Ltd. is the Sierra Gorda field. The deposit is located in Chile and contains 1.3 billion tons of ore rich in copper, gold and molybdenum. It was expected that copper mining from Sierra Gorda would start in 2014 and exceed 200,000 tons per year.

Recent developments 
In May 2015, a new production line was launched at the Nitroerg plant in Bieruń .

Corporate affairs

Structure
KGHM Polska Miedź currently has two subsidiaries:

 KGHM International Ltd. is a wholly owned subsidiary
 Sierra Gorda SCM is a 55% subsidiary

Leadership 
KGHM is led by a five-member management board, which is led by president and CEO Marcin Chludziński. The other members are Radosław Stach, Katarzyna Kreczmańska-Gigol, Adam Bugajczuk and Paweł Gruza. The supervisory board is led by chairman Andrzej Kisielewicz and vice chairman Leszek Banaszak.

Shareholder 
Since July 1997, KGHM has been listed on the Warsaw Stock Exchange.

As of February 2019 the company's shareholder structure is:

 31.79% - Polish State Treasury
5.05% - Nationale-Nederlanden OFE
 5.02% - Aviva OFE
58.13% - Other shareholders

Operations
KGHM has operations in the main areas mining and enrichment, metallurgy (smelting and refining) and project development and is currently active in four countries: Poland, Canada, Chile and the USA. In 2017, the company produced a total of 656 thousand tons of copper, 1,234 thousand tons of silver, 117 thousand troy ounces of gold, and 10 thousand tons of molybdenum.

Mining and enrichment

Robinson Mine

The Robinson Mine is located in Nevada. It is an open pit mine that produces copper with byproduct gold and molybdenum. It was KGHM International's most profitable mine, pulling in a net revenue of $532.9 million in 2012.

Carlota Mine
The Carlota Mine is located in Arizona. Like the Robinson mine, it is an open pit mine and produces copper. It is scheduled to close in 2013, despite operating through multiple court challenges. Its net revenue for 2012 was $84.1 million.

Sierra Gorda 

Sierra Gorda Project mining in Chile is a Copper-Molybdenum open pit mine which started production on October 1, 2014 and is a jointly operated by KGHM International Ltd (55%), Sumitomo Metal Mining Co. (31.5%) and Sumitomo Corporation (13.5%).

Franke Mine
The Franke Mine is located in northern Chile. It is also an open pit mine and produces copper. Its net revenue for 2012 was $152.5 million. KGHM International is blending Franke pit with a partnered China mine, with less mining being focused on Franke.

Smelting and refining
KGHM owns three copper smelters: "Głogów", "Legnica", and "Cedynia". KGHM's smelters also produce lead, refined lead, sulphuric acid, nickel sulphate, and platinum-palladium concentrate.

Projects under development

Deep Głogów
Victoria
Ajax Mine Project
Sierra Gorda mine

Awards and recognitions 

In 2011, the company was awarded with the Fray International Sustainability Award in Mexico, for its achievements and investments towards sustainable development.

Carbon footprint
KGHM reported Total CO2e emissions (Direct + Indirect) for the twelve months ending 31 December 2020 at 3,592 Kt (-570 /-13.7% y-o-y).

References

External links
 KGHM Stock card
 Annual Reports (2005–2015)
 Sierra Gorda SCM

Metal companies of Poland
Copper mines in Chile
Silver mining companies
Government-owned companies of Poland
Multinational companies headquartered in Poland
Polish brands
Non-renewable resource companies established in 1961
1961 establishments in Poland
Companies listed on the Warsaw Stock Exchange
Copper mines in the United States